Cape Kolka is a cape on the Baltic Sea, near the entry to Gulf of Riga, on the Livonian coast, in the Courland Peninsula of Latvia. The cape is surrounded by the Irbe Strait (Irbes šaurums) which serves as the natural border with Estonia. Cape Kolka represents the north-western limit of the Gulf of Riga. East of the cape is the island of Ruhnu (Estonia) that lies in the middle of the Gulf.

Near the cape is Kolka lighthouse and the village of Kolka. There is a line of picturesque old Livonian settlements along the Baltic Sea shore, including Vaide, Saunags, Pitrags, Košrags and Sīkrags.

Climate

See also 
 Livonian people
 Livonian coast
 Kolka Lighthouse

References

External links 
 Website of Kolka
 Website of Cape Kolka

Landforms of Latvia
Headlands of Europe
Talsi Municipality
Courland